Mangapehi (or Mangapeehi) was a flag station on the North Island Main Trunk line, in the Waitomo District of New Zealand.

Ellis & Burnand had a sawmill at Mangapehi from 1901 until 1968.

Station move 

In 1950 the station was moved almost a kilometre north, away from the sawmill, at a cost of £13,405. In that year it had 23,636 passengers, 4 staff and railed  of timber and 28,633 sheep and pigs, earning £3,256 from passengers and £85,473 from freight.

Tramway 

Gradients were up to 1 in 15, requiring the use of geared Climax locos from 1905, which replaced horses on wooden rails. It also linked the station to the coal mines at Maniaiti / Benneydale. The 1904 Climax is now in the Tokomaru Steam Engine Museum, after ending service in 1954 and being briefly joined by another E & B Climax from their Manunui tramway.

Coal from the Mangapehi mine used the line between 1936 and 1952.

Gallery

References

External links 

1928 photo of derailment a mile south of the station
Video of steam train at Mangapehi in 2008

Defunct railway stations in New Zealand
Waitomo District
Rail transport in Waikato
Buildings and structures in Waikato
Railway stations opened in 1901
Railway stations closed in 1987